Ángel Zubieta Redondo (17 July 1918, died 28 October 1985) was a Spanish football player and manager.

Playing career
Zubieta was born in Galdakao, Biscay, Basque Country. He started his playing career in the 1935–36 season for Athletic Bilbao at the age of 17. His impressive performances earned him a call-up to the Spain national team in 1936, making him the youngest player ever to play for Spain at the age of only 17 years and 9 months.

Later in 1936 the Spanish civil war disrupted his playing career. During the conflict he played for the Basque Country national team. The team undertook a tour of South America and in 1939 Zubieta was signed by Argentine side San Lorenzo de Almagro. Zubieta stayed with the club for 13 seasons, playing 352 games for the club, scoring 29 goals. He occupies 3rd place on the list of San Lorenzo players with most games for the club  During his time at the club, they won the Argentine Primera in 1946 and the Copa Río de La Plata in the same year.

In 1952 Zubieta returned to Spain, joining Deportivo de La Coruña where he played until his retirement in 1956 at the age of 38.

Managerial career
After retiring as a player Zubieta took up management. He had spells in charge of Athletic Bilbao (1962–1963) Real Valladolid (1963–1964) as well as managing in Portugal Belenenses and in Mexico Real Jaén (1969–1970) and Pumas UNAM (1970–1974).

Zubieta also returned to Argentina working as manager of Club Atlético Atlanta amongst other teams. He died in Buenos Aires on 28 October 1985 of amyotrophic lateral sclerosis.

Honours
Athletic Bilbao
 La Liga: 1935–36

San Lorenzo
 Primera División Argentina: 1946
 Copa Río de La Plata: 1946

References

1918 births
1985 deaths
People from Galdakao
Sportspeople from Biscay
Footballers from the Basque Country (autonomous community)
Spanish footballers
Association football midfielders
Spain international footballers
Basque Country international footballers
La Liga players
Argentine Primera División players
Liga MX players
Athletic Bilbao footballers
San Lorenzo de Almagro footballers
Deportivo de La Coruña players
Spanish football managers
La Liga managers
Tercera División managers
Liga MX managers
Deportivo de La Coruña managers
Athletic Bilbao managers
Real Valladolid managers
Club Atlético Atlanta managers
Primeira Liga managers
C.F. Os Belenenses managers
Real Jaén managers
Club Universidad Nacional managers
Spanish emigrants to Argentina
Spanish expatriate footballers
Spanish expatriate football managers
Spanish expatriate sportspeople in Argentina
Expatriate footballers in Argentina
Spanish expatriate sportspeople in Mexico
Expatriate footballers in Mexico
Spanish expatriate sportspeople in Portugal
Expatriate football managers in Portugal
Deaths from motor neuron disease
Neurological disease deaths in Argentina